Emanuel Adler,  (born 1947) is a Uruguayan professor of political science and the Andrea and Charles Bronfman Chair in Israel Studies at the University of Toronto. He is also the editor of International Organization and an honorary professor in the Department of Political Science at the University of Copenhagen.

Adler moved to Israel in 1970, where he studied at the Hebrew University of Jerusalem, where he got a BA in History and International Relations and an MA in International Relations. In 1976 he moved to the United States, and became doctor in Political Science at University of California at Berkeley in 1982.

Adler is associated with constructivism in international relations theory. His most cited article, "Seizing the middle ground: Constructivism in world politics" argues that constructivism occupies the middle ground between rationalist approaches (such as realism and liberalism) and interpretive approaches (such as postmodernist, poststructuralist and critical approaches). 

In 2013, he was made a Fellow of the Royal Society of Canada.
In 2017, he opened the Latin American Political Science Congress.

References

External links
 Official Website of Emanuel Adler

1947 births
Living people
Uruguayan political scientists
Fellows of the Royal Society of Canada
Constructivist international relations scholars
Academic staff of the University of Toronto
Uruguayan expatriates in Israel
Uruguayan expatriates in the United States
Uruguayan expatriates in Canada
Hebrew University of Jerusalem Faculty of Social Sciences alumni
UC Berkeley College of Letters and Science alumni
Political science journal editors